Gordon MacKenzie Johnston (born January 30, 1993) is a Canadian field hockey player, who plays as a defender for Dutch Hoofdklasse club HGC and the Canadian national team.

Club career
Johnston joined HGC in the Dutch Hoofdklasse in 2021 after the 2020 Summer Olympics after having played for the Vancouver Hawks.

International career
He competed at the 2015 Pan American Games and won a silver medal. In 2016, he was named to Canada's Olympic team. He was selected for the 2018 World Cup, where he played all four games. In June 2019, he was selected in the Canada squad for the 2019 Pan American Games. They won the silver medal as they lost 5–2 to Argentina in the final.

In June 2021, Johnston was named to Canada's 2020 Summer Olympics team. He was the top goalscorer at the 2022 Men's Pan American Cup with ten goals as Canada won the bronze medal.

References

External links
 
 Gordon Johnston at Field Hockey Canada
 
 
 
 

1993 births
Living people
Canadian male field hockey players
Field hockey players from Vancouver
Male field hockey defenders
Field hockey players at the 2014 Commonwealth Games
Field hockey players at the 2015 Pan American Games
Field hockey players at the 2016 Summer Olympics
Field hockey players at the 2020 Summer Olympics
Field hockey players at the 2018 Commonwealth Games
2018 Men's Hockey World Cup players
Field hockey players at the 2019 Pan American Games
Olympic field hockey players of Canada
Pan American Games silver medalists for Canada
Pan American Games medalists in field hockey
Commonwealth Games competitors for Canada
Medalists at the 2015 Pan American Games
Medalists at the 2019 Pan American Games
HGC players
Men's Hoofdklasse Hockey players